The Joranda Falls is a waterfall located in the core area of Simlipal National Park in Mayurbhanj district in the Indian state of Odisha. The Barehipani Falls is located close to the Joranda Falls. It is the 19th highest waterfall in India.

The falls
The water plunges over a lofty cliff in a single drop, spreading out slightly as it falls.

See also
List of waterfalls in India
List of waterfalls in India by height

References 

Waterfalls of Odisha